The Scottish Women in Sport Hall of Fame, launched in 2018, is an award to recognize and honour Scottish female athletes who have made an outstanding contribution to Scottish sport, including women in their day who are considered pioneers in their sport. The women were nominated by the public and national sporting bodies, and chosen by a selected panel of experts to be inducted.

History 
Maureen McGonigle, Scottish Women in Sport's chief executive, along with Dr Fiona Skillen, lecturer and sports historian at Glasgow Caledonian University and Hannah Norton of the sport and physical activity department at Strathclyde University were tasked with selecting the final list of inductees for the inaugural Scottish Women in Sport Hall of Fame in 2018. Edna Neillis (football), Helen Graham (football), Isabel Newstead (swimming and shooting), and Marjorie Langmuir (badminton, hockey and tennis) were all confirmed in March 2018 to be inducted.

The first four women were categorized as 'pioneer inductees'. Belle Robertson (golf), Joan Watt (physiotherapy), Kari Carswell (cricket), and Maggie McEleny (swimming) also joined the list as 2018 inductees. The inaugural ceremony took place at the GoGlasgow Hotel in May 2018 and was hosted by world, European and Commonwealth swimming champion Hannah Miley.

Hall of Fame 
Scottish sportswoman in bold were inducted as 'pioneers'.

See also

 List of sports awards honoring women
 Video from Scottish Women in Sport about the 2018 awardees

References 

Women
Women
All-sports halls of fame
Awards established in 2018
Women's sport in Scotland
Women
Scotland
2018 establishments in Scotland
Annual events in Glasgow
Lists of British sportswomen
Women's halls of fame